A Family's Affairs is a 1962 novel by Ellen Douglas.

A Family's Affairs is the first novel published by Ellen Douglas. It tells the story of three generations of a Mississippi family, set in the fictional town of Homochitto. The novel was awarded the Houghton Mifflin fellowship in 1961 and was recognized as one of the five best novels of the year by The New York Times.

References

1962 novels